Hemilienardia notopyrrha is a species of sea snail, a marine gastropod mollusk in the family Raphitomidae.

Description
The length of the shell attains 5 mm, its diameter 2 mm.

(Original description) This is a pure-white turreted little species, with a conspicuous dorsal squarrose brown spot just below the suture of the body whorl. The shell contains seven whorls. The whorls are ventricose and ribbed longitudinally, crossed with a few conspicuous lirae. The aperture is narrow. The outer lip is much thickened with large denticles on the inner surface, and the columella is toothed.

Distribution
This marine species occurs off the Loyalty Islands and Mactan Island, the Philippines

References

 Wiedrick S.G. (2017). Aberrant geomorphological affinities in four conoidean gastropod genera, Clathurella Carpenter, 1857 (Clathurellidae), Lienardia Jousseaume, 1884 (Clathurellidae), Etrema Hedley, 1918 (Clathurellidae) and Hemilienardia Boettger, 1895 (Raphitomidae), with the description of fourteen new Hemilienardia species from the Indo-Pacific. The Festivus. special issue: 2-45.

External links
 

notopyrrha
Gastropods described in 1896